Melissochori, known before 1926 as Baldzha, is a village and a community of the Oraiokastro municipality. Before the 2011 local government reform it was part of the municipality of Mygdonia, of which it was a municipal district. The 2011 census recorded 3,309 inhabitants in the village. The community of Melissochori covers an area of 37.561 km2.

See also
 List of settlements in the Thessaloniki regional unit

References

Populated places in Thessaloniki (regional unit)